1,1,3,3-Tetramethyl-1,3-divinyldisiloxane is the organosilicon compound with the formula O(SiMe2CH=CH2)2 (Me = methyl).  Usually referred to as tetramethyldivinyldisiloxane, it is a colorless liquid that is employed as a ligand in organometallic chemistry and homogeneous catalysis. The ligand is a component of Karstedt's catalyst. Tetramethyldivinyldisiloxane was first prepared by hydrolysis of vinyldimethylmethoxysilane, (CH2=CH)Me2SiOMe.

References

Homogeneous catalysis
Dienes
Siloxanes
Vinyl compounds